Thomas Douglas Kinsella, CM (15 February 1932 – 15 June 2004) was a Canadian medical doctor and expert on medical ethics and founder of Canada's National Council on Ethics in Human Research.

Career
Kinsella is particularly noted for his research on ethical, legal and medical issues surrounding assisted suicide, euthanasia and genetics research. He is well known for championing research ethics, particularly as these apply to human experimentation, and was a founding member of the Tri-Council Working Group on Ethics.

Kinsella studied medicine at McGill University in Montreal in the 1950s and became professor at Queen's University in 1968. After two years at McGill, he moved to the University of Calgary, where he spend the rest of his career. In 1984, the University of Calgary appointed Kinsella as associate dean for medical bioethics. He practiced as a rheumatologist.
In 1995, he was awarded the Order of Canada for his contributions to the field of bioethics.
He was president of the Canadian Bioethics Society and a prominent witness during hearings on euthanasia held by the Canadian senate in 1995.

Legacy
The Canadian Institutes of Health Research supply an annual research grant in Kinsella's name to "the highest ranking CIHR Doctoral Research Award or Canada Graduate Scholarships Doctoral Award applicant whose research focuses on ethical issues related to health and/or health research." The CIHR Douglas Kinsella Doctoral Award for Research in Bioethics was first awarded in 2005.

Personal life 
Kinsella married his wife Lorna in Montreal in 1955. They had three sons: Warren, Kevin, and Lorne.

References

Canadian rheumatologists
Canadian immunologists
1932 births
2004 deaths
20th-century Canadian physicians
McGill University Faculty of Medicine alumni
Academic staff of the Queen's University at Kingston
Academic staff of the University of Calgary
Bioethicists